The Tomales Presbyterian Church and Cemetery, at 11 Church Street in Tomales, California, was listed on the National Register of Historic Places in 1975.

History 
The church was originally known as the Old School Presbyterian Church of Tomales. It is a historic Presbyterian church built in 1868. It is a simple white frame building,  in plan.

This building replaced another which burned in a fire just before its planned dedication in 1866. It was the first Protestant church in Marin County. The present church survived the 1906 earthquake and two fires in Tomales which destroyed many buildings in Tomales, and it is the oldest surviving Protestant church building in the county.

Its adjacent cemetery was opened in 1864, and was legally separate until deeded to the church in 1944; it was originally known as the Protestant Cemetery.

The church and cemetery were used in the 1995 film Village of the Damned.

References

External links

Presbyterian churches in California
Churches on the National Register of Historic Places in California
Protestant Reformed cemeteries
Churches completed in 1868
Churches in Marin County, California
National Register of Historic Places in Marin County, California
Cemeteries in Marin County, California